Riverway station is a light rail station on the MBTA Green Line E branch, located at the intersection of South Huntington Avenue and Huntington Avenue in Boston, Massachusetts, slightly east of Brookline Village. The station is named for the Riverway parkway which runs on an overpass just to the west.

The station is located on a street running segment of the E branch; trains run in mixed traffic rather than a dedicated median. The station has no platforms; riders wait on the sidewalks (shared with bus stops for the route 39 bus) and cross the street to reach trains. Because of this, the station is not accessible. In 2021, the MBTA indicated plans to modify the Heath Street–Brigham Circle section of the E branch with accessible platforms to replace the existing non-accessible stopping locations.

References

External links

MBTA – Riverway
 Station from Google Maps Street View

Green Line (MBTA) stations
Railway stations in Boston